Jabal Awliya (Jabal al Awliyā', Jebel Aulia, Gebel Aulia) is a village in the north-central part of Sudan, about  south of Khartoum. Nearby is the Jebel Aulia Dam, built in 1937 by the British for the Egyptian government. Jabal Awliya became a refuge camp during the Second Sudanese Civil War, housing more than 100,000 inhabitants. On February 26, 1996, a Sudanese C-130 transport plane crashed at Jabal Awliya, killing 53.

Jabal Awliya Airport
The airport hosts Sudanese Air Force along with Sudanese Army and police.

The airport hosts three helicopter squadrons (Mil Mi-8, Mil Mi-17, Mil Mi-24, Mil Mi-35) from the base. There is a short runway but only used as helipad with markings found midway.

References

Populated places in Khartoum (state)
Populated places in White Nile (state)
Villages in Sudan